Ment or MENT may refer

People 
 Eva Ment (1606–1652), Dutch governor's wife

Other uses 
 Master of Enterprise
 MENT BC, a Greek basketball club
 Myeloid and erythroid nuclear termination stage specific protein, a member of the serpin family of protease inhibitors
 Trestolone (7α-methyl-19-nortestosterone) a synthetic androgen developed for male contraception